Mungiakami railway station is located at  Mungiakami in Tripura, India. It is an Indian railway station of the Lumding–Sabroom line in the Northeast Frontier Railway zone of Indian Railways. The station is situated at  Mungiakami in  Khowai district in the Indian state of Tripura. A total of 8 Passenger trains halt at the station.

History
Mungiakami railway station became operation in 2008 with the meter gauge line from Lumding to Agartala but later in 2016 the entire section was converted to broad-gauge line.

Details 
The station lies on the 312 km-long  broad-gauge Lumding–Sabroom railway line which comes under the Lumding railway division of the Northeast Frontier Railway zone of Indian Railways. It is a single line without electrification.

Services 
 2 trains per day run between Agartala and Dharmanagar. The train stops at Mungiakami station.
 1 train per day runs between Agartala and Silchar. The train stops at Mungiakami station.

Station

Station layout

Track layout

Platforms 
There are 2 platforms and 3 tracks. These platforms are built to accommodate 24 coaches express train.

See also 

 Teliamura
 Lumding–Sabroom section
 Northeast Frontier Railway zone

References

External links
 Indian Railways site
 Indian railway fan club

Railway stations in West Tripura district
Railway stations opened in 2008
Lumding railway division